In Greek mythology, Abas (Ancient Greek: Ἄβας) was the twelfth king of Argos. His name probably derives from ἀ + βαίνω, that is, the one who does not walk away, which is in line with his tenacious and courageous character on the field of battle.

Family 
Abas was the son of Lynceus of the royal family of Argos, and Hypermnestra, the last of the Danaides. With his wife Ocalea (or Aglaea, depending on the source), he had twin sons Acrisius (grandfather of Perseus) and Proetus, and one daughter, Idomene. Abas had also an illegitimate son named Lyrcus, who gave his name to the city of Lyrcea.

The name Abantiades generally signified a descendant of this Abas, but was used especially to designate Perseus, the great-grandson of Abas, and Acrisius, a son of Abas. A female descendant of Abas, as Danaë and Atalante, was called Abantias.

Mythology 
Abas was a successful conqueror, and was the founder of the city of Abae in northeastern Phocis, home to the legendary oracular temple to Apollo Abaeus, and also of the Pelasgic Argos in Thessaly.  When Abas informed his father of the death of Danaus, he was rewarded with the shield of his grandfather, which was sacred to Hera.  Abas was said to be so fearsome a warrior that even after his death, enemies of his royal household could be put to flight simply by the sight of this shield. He bequeathed his kingdom to Acrisius and Proetus, bidding them to rule alternately, but they quarrelled even while they still shared their mother's womb.

Argive genealogy

Notes

References 
Bell, Robert E., Women of Classical Mythology: A Biographical Dictionary. ABC-Clio. 1991. .
Edith Hamilton. Mythology. New York: Mentor, 1942.
Gaius Julius Hyginus, Astronomica from The Myths of Hyginus translated and edited by Mary Grant. University of Kansas Publications in Humanistic Studies. Online version at the Topos Text Project.
Gaius Julius Hyginus, Fabulae from The Myths of Hyginus translated and edited by Mary Grant. University of Kansas Publications in Humanistic Studies. Online version at the Topos Text Project.
Maurus Servius Honoratus, In Vergilii carmina comentarii. Servii Grammatici qui feruntur in Vergilii carmina commentarii; recensuerunt Georgius Thilo et Hermannus Hagen. Georgius Thilo. Leipzig. B. G. Teubner. 1881. Online version at the Perseus Digital Library.
Pausanias, Description of Greece with an English Translation by W.H.S. Jones, Litt.D., and H.A. Ormerod, M.A., in 4 Volumes. Cambridge, MA, Harvard University Press; London, William Heinemann Ltd. 1918. Online version at the Perseus Digital Library
Pausanias, Graeciae Descriptio. 3 vols. Leipzig, Teubner. 1903.  Greek text available at the Perseus Digital Library.
Pseudo-Apollodorus, The Library with an English Translation by Sir James George Frazer, F.B.A., F.R.S. in 2 Volumes, Cambridge, MA, Harvard University Press; London, William Heinemann Ltd. 1921. Online version at the Perseus Digital Library. Greek text available from the same website.
Publius Ovidius Naso, Metamorphoses translated by Brookes More (1859–1942). Boston, Cornhill Publishing Co. 1922. Online version at the Perseus Digital Library.
Publius Ovidius Naso, Metamorphoses. Hugo Magnus. Gotha (Germany). Friedr. Andr. Perthes. 1892. Latin text available at the Perseus Digital Library.
Publius Papinius Statius, The Thebaid translated by John Henry Mozley. Loeb Classical Library Volumes. Cambridge, MA, Harvard University Press; London, William Heinemann Ltd. 1928. Online version at the Topos Text Project.
Publius Papinius Statius, The Thebaid. Vol I-II. John Henry Mozley. London: William Heinemann; New York: G.P. Putnam's Sons. 1928. Latin text available at the Perseus Digital Library.
Publius Vergilius Maro, Aeneid. Theodore C. Williams. trans. Boston. Houghton Mifflin Co. 1910. Online version at the Perseus Digital Library.
Publius Vergilius Maro, Bucolics, Aeneid, and Georgics. J. B. Greenough. Boston. Ginn & Co. 1900. Latin text available at the Perseus Digital Library.
Robert Graves. The Greek Myths. London: Penguin, 1955; Baltimore: Penguin, 1955. 
Strabo, The Geography of Strabo. Edition by H.L. Jones. Cambridge, Mass.: Harvard University Press; London: William Heinemann, Ltd. 1924. Online version at the Perseus Digital Library.
Strabo, Geographica edited by A. Meineke. Leipzig: Teubner. 1877. Greek text available at the Perseus Digital Library.

 

Princes in Greek mythology
Kings of Argos
Kings in Greek mythology
Abantiades (mythology)
Argive characters in Greek mythology
Mythology of Argos